Taruma may refer to:
 Tarumã, city in São Paulo, Brazil
 Taruma language, indigenous language of Brazil
 Taruma people, indigenous people of Brazil, Guyana and Suriname
 Tarumanagara, Java
 Vitex montevidensis, commonly called tarumã